is a Japanese actress, voice actress, singer, and fashion model. As a singer, her stage name is Adieu (stylized in all lowercase). She is the younger sister of actress, voice actress and singer Mone Kamishiraishi.

Kamishiraishi entered the entertainment industry after winning the Toho Cinderella Audition in 2011 and is represented by Toho Entertainment. She made her acting debut in 2012, and has since appeared in films such as Haruta & Chika (2017) and A Forest of Wool and Steel (2018), for which she won a Newcomer of the Year award at the 42nd Japan Academy Film Prize. She has also done voice acting, such as in Mirai (2018) and Pokémon the Movie: Secrets of the Jungle (2020), and appeared in television dramas, including the NHK taiga drama Idaten (2019) and  The Files of Young Kindaichi (2022). She released her first music single in 2015, and made her full music debut as Adieu in 2019 under the Sony Music Records label.

Early life 
Kamishiraishi was born and raised in Kagoshima Prefecture. She lived in Mexico with her family for three years from the first grade of elementary school.

Career

2011–2014: Joining Toho, television and modelling debut 
In 2011, when Kamishiraishi was in the fifth grade of elementary school, she applied for the 7th Toho Cinderella Audition, following her older sister Mone. At the age of 10, she was selected as the youngest ever Grand Prix winner out of 44,120 applicants and became a member of Toho Entertainment's Cinderella Room along with Mone, who won the Judges' Special Award. She began her career as an exclusive model for the fashion magazine Pichi Lemon in the September 2011 issue. She travelled back and forth between Kagoshima and Tokyo for work until she moved to Tokyo in her second year of middle school.

Kamishiraishi made her television series debut in the 2012 drama Bunshin, broadcast on Wowow. In 2014, she appeared in the first episode of the fourth Kindaichi series installment, The Files of Young Kindaichi Neo, as serial killer Chiemi Yusa.

2015–2017: Music and theater debut, Kirin commercial series, Haruta & Chika 
Kamishiraishi made her CD debut in June 2015 with the theme song "Su-ma-i-ru" ("Smile") for the NHK Educational TV animated series . Adieu was described only as "a 17-year-old girl attending a high school in Tokyo" and her face was obscured in all promotional materials. It was released as a single on October 4, 2017 and the music video was directed by Isao Yukisada.

In August 2016, Kamishiraishi made her first stage play appearance in the Tours Musical troupe production of Anne of Green Gables, becoming the youngest actress ever in the troupe to play main character Anne Shirley, who had also been portrayed by Mone the previous year. The next year, she made her feature film debut in Haruta & Chika and became friends with female lead Kanna Hashimoto. She also starred in the musical adaptation of Kiki's Delivery Service as main character Kiki, and played the lead character in an original stage sequel of The Girl Who Leapt Through Time.

Kamishiraishi appeared in a series of commercials for Kirin Company's Gogo no Kocha bottled tea, titled , from 2016 until 2018. The series featured her character covering popular songs, such as "Yasashii Kimochi" by Chara, "Kabutomushi" by Aiko, "Kaede" by Spitz, and "366 nichi" by HY.

2018: A Forest of Wool and Steel and Mirai 
Kamishiraishi co-starred in a film with her sister for the first time in A Forest of Wool and Steel. For this film, she won a 42nd Japan Academy Film Prize for Newcomer of the Year.

The animated film Mirai, in which Kamishiraishi voiced main character Kun Ota, was selected for the Directors' Fortnight at the 2018 Cannes Film Festival,  and she attended the official screening. The film would also be nominated in the animated film categories of the 91st Academy Awards and 76th Golden Globe Awards. Director Mamoru Hosoda later directed the new title sequence of the Nippon TV program Friday Road Show!, with the concept of a girl who is visiting a salon in a foreign country and Kamishiraishi performing its theme song "Era".

Kamishiraishi also appeared in the TBS drama Stepmom And Daughter Blues as the daughter-in-law of the main character. She cited the series in a 2021 interview as her "turning point", as she felt it pulled her out of her shyness at the time.

In November, Kamishiraishi sang a new version of "Paprika" arranged by Yoko Kanno, which was released on NHK's website and YouTube. It was used in the NHK BS1 broadcast of Legends on Ice on November 11, commemorating the 40th NHK Trophy.

2019: NHK historical drama, Adieu full debut 
Kamishiraishi made her first appearance in an NHK taiga drama as Olympic gold medalist Hideko Maehata in Idaten. In addition to practicing swimming for the role, she underwent physical transformation to an athlete's body shape by gaining 7 kg in weight. The same year, she also portrayed high school swimmer Reina Kageyama in the drama series .

On September 6, Kamishiraishi revealed herself as Adieu and announced that she would start full-fledged music activities under that name. She performed the ending theme "Ao" for the TV anime Granblue Fantasy The Animation Season 2, which started airing on October 4. Adieu is the first ever performer featured on the YouTube channel The First Take, singing "Narratage" in a video published on November 15; as of June 2021, she has appeared four times on the channel. Her first mini-album adieu 1 was released on November 27 and she held her first live event "adieu secret show case [unveiling]" at the Daikanyama Loop club in Tokyo on December 19.

2020–present: One Summer Story, NHK asadora and other television dramas 
On June 30, 2021, Adieu released her second mini-album adieu 2.

In August 2021, Kamishiraishi portrayed Minami Sakuda in the film One Summer Story, adapted from the manga  by Retto Tajima. Since the character is a backstroke swimmer and she has portrayed a breaststroke swimmer in Idaten and front crawl swimmer in Mr. Hiiragi's Homeroom, she remarked that if she gets a butterfly swimmer role, she would have achieved a unique "medley" of portraying characters of all four competitive swimming styles.

Kamishiraishi appeared in her first starring role in a television drama in Solomon's Perjury (2021), broadcast on Wowow, the same station where she made her acting debut nine years prior. She then co-starred in the fifth installment of The Files of Young Kindaichi television series (2022) as Miyuki Nanase, the childhood friend of main character Kindaichi (played by Shunsuke Michieda), becoming the first actress to portray Miyuki after playing a criminal role in a Kindaichi series in 2014. She also appeared as the main character's younger sister in the 106th NHK asadora Chimudondon, which started airing in June 2022; the previous year, her older sister Mone had starred in the previous asadora, Come Come Everybody.

Personal life 
Kamishiraishi lives with her older sister by two years, Mone Kamishiraishi. She gets along well with her sister and considers her both a rival and comrade. Their father is a social studies teacher and their mother is a former music teacher and piano instructor. She went to a high school that required rigorous regular examinations and credits, aiming to commit to both her studies and work. At university, she majored in humanities and studied art theory, sociology, and photography history.

Her interests include singing, running, photography, and visiting museums. Around the third year of junior high school, she became interested in analog cameras and was taught by Yuina Kuroshima, with whom she co-starred in the dramas Goodbye, Debussy and Chimudondon.

Kamishiraishi has loved fishes since childhood and has considerable knowledge on the subject. She has revealed that she would have pursued an academic career in fisheries science if she did not enter the entertainment industry.

Filmography

Film

Dubbing

Television

Discography

Singles

EPs

Awards

References

External links
 

Living people
2000 births
Japanese expatriates in Mexico
21st-century Japanese women singers
21st-century Japanese singers
21st-century Japanese actresses
Actors from Kagoshima Prefecture
Musicians from Kagoshima Prefecture
People from Kagoshima